Sally Faulkner (born 1944) is an English actress.

She is perhaps best known for her film appearances in movies such as The Body Stealers (1969), Layout for 5 Models (1972), Vampyres (1974), Feelings (1975), I'm Not Feeling Myself Tonight (1976), Confessions of a Driving Instructor (1976), The Deadly Females (1976), Prey (1977), Confessions from the David Galaxy Affair (1979) and Jaguar Lives! (1979).

Her television credits include Coronation Street, Brookside, Doctor Who, Dixon of Dock Green, Z-Cars, The Sweeney, Target, The Professionals, Bird of Prey, Minder, Sherlock Holmes, House of Cards, EastEnders, Just Good Friends, The Bill, Chancer, Casualty, Pie in the Sky, Grange Hill, Wycliffe, Silent Witness and Doctors.

Partial filmography
Hot Millions (1968) - Stewardess on Rio Plane (uncredited)
Doctor Who: The Invasion (1968) - Isobel Watkins
The Body Stealers (1969) - Joanna
Layout for 5 Models (1972) - Kitty
Vampyres (1974) - Harriet
Feelings (1976) - Mrs. Linden
I'm Not Feeling Myself Tonight (1976) - Cheryl Bascombe
Confessions of a Driving Instructor (1976) - Mrs. Dent
The Deadly Females (1976) - Carol
Prey (1977) - Josephine
Confessions from the David Galaxy Affair (1979) - Amanda
Jaguar Lives! (1979) - Terry
Brookside (1988) - Mrs Downs 
Coronation Street (1991) - Mrs Maxwell-Glover
Emmerdale (1993) - Barbara Ferguson

References

External links
 

British film actresses
British television actresses
1944 births
Living people